The Motiv3 Pro-Cycling Team was a Norwegian UCI Continental cycling team that existed from 2012 until 2014. On July 31, 2014, the team lost its UCI Continental status, and was a club team until its disappearance at the end of the season.

Major wins
2012
Prologue Sibiu Cycling Tour, Jon Bergsland

References

UCI Continental Teams (Europe)
Cycling teams established in 2012
Cycling teams disestablished in 2014
Cycling teams based in Norway
Defunct cycling teams based in Norway